Paul Kozlicek (22 July 1937, in Vienna, Austria – 26 November 1999, in Sevilla, Spain) was an Austrian football player.

His older brother Ernst was also an international footballer and was known as Kozlicek I while Paul was named Kozlicek II.

Club career
Kozlicek played for several clubs, including SC Wacker Wien (1949–1959), Linzer ASK (1959–1965) and SK Admira Wien (1965–1971).

International career
He made his debut for Austria in March 1956 against France and was a participant at the 1958 FIFA World Cup. He earned 14 caps, scoring one goal.

Honours
Austrian Football Bundesliga (2):
 1965, 1966
Austrian Cup (1):
 1965, 1966

External links
  Austria Wien archive

References

1937 births
1999 deaths
Footballers from Vienna
Austrian footballers
Austria international footballers
1958 FIFA World Cup players
LASK players
Austrian Football Bundesliga players
Association football forwards
FC Admira Wacker Mödling players